Colaspidea ovulum is a species of leaf beetle of Tunisia and Algeria described by Léon Fairmaire in 1866.

References

Eumolpinae
Beetles of North Africa
Taxa named by Léon Fairmaire
Beetles described in 1866